Lonely Hearts Club is a studio album by American country artist Billie Jo Spears. It was released in February 1978 via United Artists Records and contained 11 tracks. The album featured mostly new recordings, which included three singles: the title track, "I've Got to Go" "'57 Chevrolet". All three recordings reached the top 20 of the American country chart, while also reaching top positions in Canada. The album itself reached the American country albums chart. Lonely Hearts Club was met with positive reviews from critics.

Background, recording and content
Billie Jo Spears reached the peak of her career while recording for United Artists Records in the 1970s. She topped the country charts with "Blanket on the Ground" (1975) and had three top ten singles with "What I've Got in Mind" (1976), "Misty Blue" (1976) and "If You Want Me" (1977). A string of top 20 singles followed through the decade, including "Lonely Hearts Club". The song would serve as the title for Spears's 1978 studio album. The project was recorded in August 1977 at the Jack Clement Recording Studio, located in Nashville, Tennessee. The sessions were produced by Larry Butler.

Lonely Hearts Club consisted of 11 tracks. Featured were five songs written by Larry Butler: the title track, "There's More to a Tear (Than Meets the Eye)", "That's the Way It Is", "The Lovin' Kind" and "I've Got to Go". Songwriter Roger Bowling co-wrote the latter recordings with Butler, along with solely writing the track "'57 Chevrolet". Spears herself contributed to the writing of "There's More to a Tear (Than Meets the Eye)". The album project was described as having both traditional country and pop sounds.

Release and critical reception
Lonely Hearts Club was released by United Artists Records in February 1978. It was the thirteenth studio album of Spears's career. The label distributed it as a vinyl LP and a cassette. The album was met with positive reviews. Cashbox magazine praised the production of Larry Butler in their review: "Larry Butler manages to dress up country music with pop flavor without destroying the basic feel'." They also described Spears as a "versatile vocalist" who often recorded material with a "strong storyline". Alan Cackett of Country Music People magazine called  it "her most commercial album so far". Cackett also noted that Spears's vocal delivery was stronger on the album: "For the first time since she left Capitol, Billie Jo is allowed to use the full scope of her voice on an album without the listener having to strain to hear it through layers of instrumental work."

Chart performance and singles
Lonely Hearts Club entered America's Billboard Top Country Albums chart in April 1978. It reached its peak position of 46 on the chart and spent three weeks on Billboard in total. It was Spears's second to last album appearance on the Billboard country survey. A total of three singles were spawned from the Lonely Hearts Club. The title track was the first single issued for the intended project. United Artists first released it in December 1977. It reached number 18 on the Billboard Hot Country Songs chart in America and number nine on Canada's RPM Country chart. "I've Got to Go" was released as the second single in March 1978. The single reached number 17 on the Billboard country chart and number 26 on the RPM country chart. "'57 Chevrolet" was then issued as the final single in July 1978. It reached number 16 on the Billboard country songs chart and number 12 on the RPM country tracks chart.

Track listing

Personnel
All credits are adapted from the liner notes of Lonely Hearts Club.

Musical personnel
Tommy Allsup – Bass guitar
Byron Bach – Strings
Brenton Banks – Strings
George Binkley III – Strings
Jimmy Capps – Guitar
Jerry Carrigan – Drums
Fred Carter – Guitar
Marvin Chantry – Strings
Roy Christensen – Strings
Charles Cochran – Piano
Jimmy Colvard – Guitar
Pete Drake – Steel guitar
Carl Gorodetzky – Strings

Buddy Harman – Drums
The Jordanaires – Background vocals
Carol Montgomery – Background vocals
Sheldon Kurland – Strings
Bob Moore – Bass
Hargus "Pig" Robbins – Piano
Billy Sanford – Guitar
Jerry Shook – Guitar
Steven Smith – Strings
Billie Jo Spears – Lead vocals
Donald Teal – Strings
Gary Vanosdale – Strings
Bobby Wood – Piano

Technical personnel
Larry Butler – Producer
Bill Burks – Design
Bill Justis – String arrangement
Ria Lewerke – Art direction
Billy Sherrill – Engineer
Bob Sowell – Mastering

Chart performance

Release history

References

1978 albums
Albums arranged by Bill Justis
Albums produced by Larry Butler (producer)
Billie Jo Spears albums
United Artists Records albums